Linsingen may refer to:

 Linsingen (Frielendorf), a constituent community of Frielendorf, Hesse, Germany
 Army Group Linsingen, a German army group which operated in Poland during World War I
 Alexander von Linsingen (1850–1935), German general during World War I
 Wilhelm von Linsingen, commander in the Anglo-allied army in the battle of Waterloo (1815), see order of battle of the Waterloo Campaign
 Karl von Linsingen, commander of Hesse-Kassel troops in the Battle of Boxtel (1794)